Lookout Mountain is an  summit of the Strawberry Range in Grant County, Oregon in the United States.

See also
List of mountain peaks of Oregon

References

Mountains of Grant County, Oregon
North American 2000 m summits